Lichoceves is a municipality and village in Prague-West District in the Central Bohemian Region of the Czech Republic. It has about 400 inhabitants.

Administrative parts
The village of Noutonice is an administrative part of Lichoceves.

History
The first written mention of Lichoceves is from 1228.

References

Villages in Prague-West District